Jayaram Subramaniam, (born 10 December 1965) known mononymously as Jayaram, is an Indian actor who predominantly works in Malayalam films, along with a few Tamil and Telugu films. He is also a chenda percussionist, mimicry artist, and occasional playback singer. Jayaram has acted in more than 200 films and has received several awards, including the Padma Shri, two Kerala State Film Awards, one Tamil Nadu State Film Awards, and four Filmfare Awards South.

Jayaram started as a mimicry artist at the Kalabhavan institute during the 1980s. He made his acting debut in a leading role in Padmarajan's 1988 film Aparan. He established himself as a successful leading actor in 1990s by starring in family dramas and comedies—such as, but not limited to Peruvannapurathe Visheshangal (1989), Shubhayathra (1990), Sandhesam (1991), Georgootty C/O Georgootty (1991), Malootty (1992), Ayalathe Adheham (1992),  Meleparambil Aanveedu (1993), CID Unnikrishnan B.A., B.Ed. (1994), Puthukkottayile Puthumanavalan (1995), Aniyan Bava Chetan Bava (1995), Thooval Kottaram (1996), Krishnagudiyil Oru Pranayakalathu (1997), Summer in Bethlehem (1998), Veendum Chila Veettukaryangal (1999), One Man Show (2001), and Manassinakkare (2003). The 2000 Tamil film Thenali won him two Tamil Nadu State Film Awards. Jayaram won his first Kerala State Film Award, the Special Jury Award for his performance in Thooval Kottaram (1996). He won the Kerala State Film Award for Second Best Actor for his performance in Swayamvara Panthal (2000). Jayaram won the Filmfare Award for Best Actor 3 times, for his performances in Thooval Kottaram (1996), Theerthadanam (2001), and Manassinakkare (2003).

In 2011, the Government of India honoured him with Padma Shri, the fourth highest civilian award of the country for his contributions towards the Indian film industry.

Early life
Jayaram was born on 10 December 1965 in a Tamil family as the second among three children of late Subramaniyam and late Thankam at Perumbavoor, Kerala. He had an elder brother named Venkataram, who died at a young age, and a younger sister named Manjula. He did his primary education at Government Boys High School, Perumbavoor. He graduated with a bachelor's degree from Sree Sankara College, Kalady. And also did a graduate course in Chenda from the National Institute of Ulsavam Sciences & Technology, Thrissur. He became a medical representative soon after college and later joined the Kalabhavan institute and learned and performed mimicry on a number of stages, which paved his way to the Malayalam film industry. Malayalam writer Malayattoor Ramakrishnan is Jayaram's maternal uncle.

Career
After college, he joined Kalabhavan, a professional mimicry troupe in Kochi. At the age of 22, he was introduced into the cinema field by script writer and filmmaker Padmarajan who gave Jayaram his launching pad with the 1988 film Aparan. Jayaram subsequently acted in Padmarajan's Moonnam Pakkam (1988) and Innale (1989). Padmarajan became his mentor in his film career till the former's death in January 1991. He became one of the Superstars of the Malayalam film industry through the film Meleparambil Aanveedu(1993) which Rajasenan directed. The film was a commercial success and ran for over 200 days in theatres. His on-screen chemistry with Shobana worked well in films Innale, Meleparambil Aanveedu and Dhwani.

He is noted for playing in Kamal's films during the late 1980s and early 1990s, in films such as Pradeshika Varthakal (1989), Peruvannapurathe Visheshangal (1989) and Shubha Yathra (1990) (all of which scripted by Ranjith), where he co-starred with his wife Parvathy. He later did a film scripted by Ranjith with the story by Jagathy Sreekumar and directed by Viji Thampi named Witness (1988). He teamed up with Viji Thampi and Ranjith in Nanma Niranjavan Srinivasan (1990), where he played a police constable who is in search of a criminal played by Mukesh. During the early 90s he acted in Bharathan's Keli (1991) and Malootty (1992).

He has acted in several of Sathyan Anthikkad's films. Their first film was Ponmuttayidunna Tharavu (1988). Around that time, Jayaram played a supporting role in Sathyan Anthikkad's Artham (1989). Thalayanamanthram (1990) and Sandesham (1991), were both written and co-starred by Sreenivasan. Anthikkad and Jayaram later went on to make Thooval Kottaram (1996), which was commercial success, continued their success in films - Irattakuttikalude Achan (1997), Veendum Chila Veettukaryangal (1999), Kochu Kochu Santhoshangal (2000), Yathrakarude Sradhakku (2002), Manassinakkare (2003), Bhagya Devatha and Kadha Thudarunnu.

In his films, he regularly ensured cast included K.P.A.C Lalitha, Unnikrishnan and Jagathy Sreekumar.

He acted in a leading role along with Mammootty and Suresh Gopi in Joshi's Dhruvam (1993). Other films with Gopi include Viji Thampi's Nagarangalil Chennu Raparkam (1990), Thooval Sparsam (1990), Jayaraj's Paithrukam (1993), and Sibi Malayil's Summer in Bethlehem (1998). He co-starred with Mohanlal in Bharath Gopi's Ulsavapittennu, Peruvannapurathe Visheshangal (1989) and Priyadarshan's Advaitham (1991).

His association with director Rajasenan created many movies such as Kadinjool Kalyanam (1991), Ayalathe Addeham (1992), Meleparambil Aanveedu (1993), CID Unnikrishnan B.A., B.Ed. (1994), Aniyan Bava Chetan Bava (1995), Aadyathe Kanmani (1995), Swapna Lokathe Balabhaskaran (1996), and Kadhanayakan (1997). He also played Aravindan in Siddique's Friends (1999) in which he co-starred with Sreenivasan and Mukesh was the highest grossing Malayalam movie of 1999 and collected 11 crore. In the first decade of the 21st century his commercial successful films include Kochu Kochu Santhoshangal (2000), Yathrakarude Sradhakku (2002), Ente Veedu Appuvinteyum (2003), Manassinakkare (2003), Veruthe Oru Bharya (2008). His critically acclaimed roles include Karunakaran in B. Kannan's Theerthadanam (2001) and Lonappan in Rajeev Kumar's Sesham (2002).

He also forayed into Tamil cinema including roles in Gokulam, Purushalakshanam, Priyanka, Kolangal, Murai Mamman and Pathini. He played the roles of Dr Kailash and Ayyappan Nair in the Kamal Haasan-starred Thenali and Panchathanthiram. They first came together on-screen in Chanakyan (1989). Recently he has done more supporting roles in Tamil, such as antagonist roles in Saroja and Dhaam Dhoom, and a comic role in Aegan.

His movies include Manassinakkare (2003), Njaan Salperu Raman Kutty (2004), Finger Print (2005), Alice in Wonderland (2005), Madhuchandralekha (2006), Moonnamathoral (2006), and Anchal Oral Arjunan (2007). In mid-2008, he played Sugunan in Akku Akbar's Veruthe Oru Bharya (2008) and Thuppakki (2012), which established him as one of the leading comedy actors of Malayalam and Tamil films.

In 2008, he made a comeback after a series of commercial flops by the film Veruthe Oru Bharya (2008), which was both critical and commercial success at the box office and ran over 100 days in theatres.

In 2009, he performed in Sathyan Anthikkad's Bhagyadevatha, a commercial success and in 2010 his first film was Happy Husbands, commercial success with 150 days theatrical run, and next he again joined with Sathyan Anthikkadu for Kadha Thudarunnu. In 2011, he was featured in commercially successful films like Makeup Man, along with comedic roles in Seniors and Chinatown and also Swapna Sanchari. He then acted in films such as Aadupuliyattam (2016) and Pattabhiraman (2019). He play an important role Azhwarkkadiyan Nambi alias Thirumala in Mani Ratnam historical action adventure Ponniyin Selvan: I (2022).

Personal life
Jayaram married actress Parvathy on 7 September 1992. The couple has a son named Kalidas Jayaram who is an actor as well as the winner of the National Film Award for Best Child Artist in 2003 for his second movie Ente Veedu Appuvinteyum  and a daughter named Malavika Jayaram. Currently, he resides at Valasaravakkam, Chennai, Tamil Nadu with family. Jayaram is a trained Chenda artist. He has stated that he is an elephant lover.

Awards

Civilian awards
 2011 – Padma Shri

Kerala State Film Awards
 1996 – Special Jury Award – Thooval Kottaram
 2000 – Second Best Actor – Swayamvara Panthal

Tamil Nadu State Film Awards
 2000 – Special Prize – Thenali

Filmfare Awards
 1996 – Best Actor – Thooval Kottaram
 2001 – Best Actor – Theerthadanam
 2002 – Best Supporting Actor (Tamil) – Panchathantiram
 2003 – Best Actor – Manassinakkare

Asianet Film Awards
 1998 – Best Actor Award – Sneham
 2001 – Best Actor Award – Theerthadanam, Uthaman
 2008 – Most Popular Actor Award – Veruthe Oru Bharya
 2011 – Most Popular Actor Award – Swapna Sanchari
 2012 – Special Commomeration
 2014 – Golden Star of the year
 2018 - Golden Star of the year
Asianet Comedy Awards
 2015 - Best Actor - Thinkal Muthal Velli Vare
 2017 - Best Actor - Achayans
South Indian International Movie Awards
 2012 — Nominated—Best Comedian – Thuppakki
 2019- Nominated- SIIMA Award for Best Actor in a Negative Role (Telugu) for -Bhaagamathie
Other awards
 1996 – Sini Best Actor Award for Thooval Kottaram
 1996 – Rotary Club Award for Thooval Kottaram
 2002 – V. Shantaram Award for his performance in Shesham
 2008 – J.C Foundation award for the best actor for his performance in Veruthe Oru Bharya
 2011 – Sathyan Award for Lifetime Achievement
 2014 – Vayalar Film award for Best Actor for Nadan and Swapaanam
 2014 – Kerala Kalamandalam M. K. K. Nair Puraskaram
 Jaihind TV awards 2011: Best actor (Kadha Thudarunnu)

Filmography

References

External links

 https://web.archive.org/web/20190506074929/http://jayaramonline.com/
 

Indian male film actors
Kerala State Film Award winners
Living people
Male actors from Kochi
20th-century Indian male actors
21st-century Indian male actors
Recipients of the Padma Shri in arts
Male actors in Malayalam cinema
Tamil Nadu State Film Awards winners
Filmfare Awards South winners
1965 births
Non-Malayali Keralites
Chenda players
Indian male classical musicians
Musicians from Kochi
Male actors in Tamil cinema